The 1990 Sonoma State Cossacks football team represented Sonoma State University as a member of the Northern California Athletic Conference (NCAC) during the 1990 NCAA Division II football season. Led by second-year head coach Tim Walsh, Sonoma State compiled an overall record of 7–3 with a mark of 4–1 in conference play, placing second in the NCAC. The team outscored its opponents 290 to 156 for the season. The Cossacks played home games at Cossacks Stadium in Rohnert Park, California.

Schedule

Notes

References

Sonoma State
Sonoma State Cossacks football seasons
Sonoma State Cossacks football